Kennedy Square is a lost 1916 silent film historical drama directed by S. Rankin Drew and starring Antonio Moreno, Muriel Ostriche and Charles Kent.  It was produced by the Vitagraph Company of America and released through V-L-S-E.

Cast
Charles Kent - St. George Temple
Antonio Moreno - Harry Rutter
Muriel Ostriche - Kate Seymour
Tom Brooke - Douglas Seymour
Raymond Bloomer - Langdon Willetts
Daniel Jarrett - Col. Rutter
Hattie Delaro - Mrs. Rutter
Harold Foshay - Doctor(*as Harold Forshay)
Herbert Barry - Dawson
Logan Paul - Artig

References

External links

1916 films
American silent feature films
American black-and-white films
Lost American films
Films based on American novels
Vitagraph Studios films
Films directed by S. Rankin Drew
American historical drama films
Lost drama films
1910s historical drama films
1916 lost films
1916 drama films
1910s American films
Silent American drama films